The Hawthorne Handicap was an American Thoroughbred horse race run annually in May from 1974 thru 2008 at Hollywood Park Racetrack in Inglewood, California. The race was open to fillies and mares age three and older and regularly drew from the West Coast's top female runners. 

The Hawthorne Handicap was raced on three different surfaces.
1973-1974: dirt
1976-1980: turf
1981-2006: dirt
2007-2008: all weather dirt composite track

Historical notes
The inaugural running of the Hawthorne Handicap took place on May 25, 1974 and was won by Tallahto. Owned by Elizabeth Keck and bred by her husband Howard, Tallahto would win eight stakes races for her owner of which three were Grade 1 events and two were Grade 2 stakes. 

In 2001, Hall of Fame jockey Chris McCarron won his fifth consecutive edition of the Hawthorne Handicap aboard Printemps. That feat tied McCarron with the Hollywood Park record for most consecutive wins of a single race set in the Los Angeles Handicap in 1974 by Don Pierce.

Hall of Fame jockeys Laffit Pincay Jr. and Chris McCarron each won the Hawthorne Handicap eight times. Their combined total of sixteen wins equals half of all the Hawthorne Handicap editions ever run.

In 1989 and 1990 Bayakoa won back-to-back editions of the Hawthorne. Both times, she would go on to win the Breeders' Cup Distaff and be voted the Eclipse Award as the American Champion Older Female Horse.  

The final edition of the Hawthorne Handicap took place on May 4, 2008 and was won by Tough Tiz's Sis owned by Karl Watson & Paul Weitman and ridden by Aaron Gryder.

Records
Speed  record:
 1:32.80 @ 1 mile: Bayakoa (1989)
 1:40.60 @ 1-1/16 miles on turf: Country Queen (1980)
 1:41.84 @ 1-1/16 miles on dirt: Tough Tiz's Sis  (2008)

Most wins:
 Country Queen (1979, 1980)
 Adored (1984, 1985)
 Bayakoa (1989, 1990)

Most wins by a jockey:
 8 - Laffit Pincay Jr. (1974, 1978, 1979, 1980, 1985, 1986, 1989, 1990)
 8 - Chris McCarron (1981, 1987, 1995, 1997, 1998, 1999, 2000, 2001) 

Most wins by a trainer:
 6 - Ron McAnally (1989, 1990, 1991, 1995, 1999, 2001)

Most wins by an owner:
2 - Maribel G. Blum (1979, 1980)
2 - H. Joseph Allen (1981, 1982)
2 - Ethel D. Jacobs (Lessee) (1984, 1985)
2 - Frank & Janis Whitham (1989, 1990)
2 - Sidney & Jenny Craig (1995, 1999)

Winners

References

Discontinued horse races
Horse races in California
Hollywood Park Racetrack
Mile category horse races for fillies and mares
Recurring sporting events established in 1974
Recurring sporting events disestablished in 2009